John Holt Duncan (July 7, 1820 – May 27, 1896) was one of eight founders of Beta Theta Pi, a prominent college fraternity founded at Miami University in 1839 and was its first president.

Biography
John was born in Cynthiana, Kentucky to John Hicks Duncan and Pauline Randolph Holt.

He made a career in law as a lawyer and judge in Houston & Bexar County, Texas.  He served as a Confederate Artillery Captain in the 31st Texas Cavalry during the Civil War.  He lost a leg as a result of a battle wound on September 20, 1862 at the First Battle of Newtonia.  He was taken in by an Old Confederate soldier's family.  When the soldier returned home, Duncan was found by the authorities.  Because housing a confederate soldier was punishable by death, the old soldier was executed in front of his wife and family.  The family begged for Duncan's life to be spared and it was.  John Holt Duncan spent the rest of his life caring for the family and he died penniless because of it.  After the war he moved to Houston, Texas where he practiced law (district justice 1864-65, city attorney 1877-79. He became Chief Justice of Bexar County.

He died in the Confederate Old Soldier's Home in Austin, Texas in 1896 and was buried in the Confederate Veterans section of the Texas State Cemetery.

Duncan's wooden leg is on display at the National Headquarters of Beta Theta Pi at Oxford, Ohio.

See also
List of Beta Theta Pi members

Notes

Sources
 Brown, James T., ed., Catalogue of Beta Theta Pi, New York: 1917.

External links
 Photo of Duncan's Headstone

1820 births
1896 deaths
People from Houston
People from San Antonio
Texas state court judges
Miami University alumni
Beta Theta Pi founders
19th-century American judges